"Destroyer" is a song by heavy metal band Static-X and the lead single from their album Cannibal. The song was released digitally on March 20, 2007. On the U.S. weekly Mainstream Rock chart, it peaked at number 23.

The video was filmed on March 7 using two roller derby teams, featuring a 1970s theme. In the video, several illegal roller derby moves are shown - such as clotheslining an opponent and punching during a fight. The band members appear in the video as themselves and other people attending the roller derby, all with penis innuendos for names. Wayne Static appears as the derby's announcer, "Dick Hurtz." Tony Campos and Nick Oshiro are coaches for the two teams, "Mike Rotch" and "Mon Keedick" and Koichi Fukuda appears as a crazed fan, "Don Keedick."

On March 20, 2007, Static-X released the "Destroyer EP" exclusively at Hot Topic stores across the United States.

The song was featured in the commercial for WWE SmackDown vs. Raw 2008.

EP track listing
"Destroyer" — 2:47
"Cannibal" — 3:13
"Love Dump" — 4:20
"Push It" — 2:36
"I'm with Stupid" (Music video)

Chart performance

References

2007 singles
2007 songs
Static-X songs
Songs written by Tony Campos
Songs written by Wayne Static
Reprise Records singles
Roller derby mass media